Neochrysops may refer to one of two different genera of insects:

Neochrysops is a monotypic genus of horse fly containing only the species Neochrysops globosus.
Neochrysops is a synonym for the butterfly genus Lepidochrysops.